Adela Humood Alaboudi (Arabic: عديلة حمود) (born 1 July 1967) is an Iraqi politician. She served as the Iraqi Minister of Health from 2014 to 2018.

References

Living people
1967 births
Members of the Council of Representatives of Iraq
People from Maysan Governorate
Iraqi Shia Muslims
Government ministers of Iraq